Bloodgood is an American Christian metal band.

Bloodgood may also refer to:

Bloodgood, a 1986 album by Bloodgood.
Bloodgood (surname)
 A. palmatum 'Bloodgood', a cultivar of Japanese Maple with dark red foliage and stems